William C. Vandenberg Sr. (October 3, 1884June 9, 1971) was the 49th lieutenant governor of Michigan.

Early life 
Vandenberg was born on October 3, 1884 in Holland, Michigan. Vandenberg graduated Holland High School in 1904, and then started to attend Voorheis' Business College in Indianapolis, Indiana.

Career 
Vandenberg founded the Vandenburg Oil Company and oversaw its function from 1919 until it closed in 1946. Vandenberg was served as a member of the Michigan Senate from the 23rd district from 1945 to 1950. From 1951 to 1953, Vandenberg served as the lieutenant governor. In 1952, Vandenberg was a failed candidate in the Republican primary for the 1952 Michigan gubernatorial election.

Personal life 
Vandenberg married Florence Fairbanks in 1909. Together they had two children. Vandenberg was Methodist.

Death 
Vandenberg died of a heart attack on June 9, 1971 in Holland, Michigan. Vandenberg was dead upon arrival at Holland Hospital. Vandenberg is interred at the Pilgrim Home Cemetery in Holland, Michigan.

References 

1884 births
1971 deaths
Republican Party Michigan state senators
Methodists from Michigan
Lieutenant Governors of Michigan
Holland High School (Michigan) alumni
People from Holland, Michigan
20th-century American politicians